Mount Angier is a prominent peak in the Moore Mountains, Queen Elizabeth Range. Named by the New Zealand Geological Survey Antarctic Expedition (NZGSAE) (1961–62) for Lieutenant Commander Donald L. Angier, U.S. Navy, pilot of the reconnaissance, landing and pick-up flights in this area.

References

Mountains of the Ross Dependency
Shackleton Coast